The Mali national football team (French:  Équipe de football du Mali ) represents Mali in men's international football and is governed by the Malian Football Federation. The team's nickname is Les Aigles. They represent both FIFA and the Confederation of African Football (CAF).

While Mali is a major youth football power in both Africa and the world, they have never qualified for any senior FIFA World Cup finals in history. They have qualified for the Africa Cup of Nations on 12 occasions.

Mali were suspended by FIFA on 17 March 2017 due to 'government interference' with the national football association, namely dissolving its executive committee. However, the side was re-instated by FIFA on 29 April after the executive committee was re-introduced by the Malian government.

History
Mali reached the 1972 African Nations Cup final, but lost 3–2 to Congo. They failed to qualify for the finals again until 1994 when they reached the semi-finals, an achievement repeated in 2002, 2004, 2012 and 2013.

They played their first World Cup qualifier in the year 2000. As part of the CAF's qualifiers for the 2002 World Cup, Mali lost in the preliminary round to Libya. Two years later, the country hosted the 2002 African Cup of Nations.

Mali's under-23's team managed to qualify for the 2004 Summer Olympics in Greece. The team coached by Cheick Kone managed to reach the quarter-finals of the Olympic tournament before losing to Italy.

In the 2006 World Cup qualifiers, Mali beat Guinea-Bissau in the preliminaries. In the resulting second round, Mali finished fifth in its group. On 27 March 2005, riots broke out in Bamako after Mali lost a World Cup qualifier to Togo, 2–1 on a last minute goal.

In the 2010 African Nations Cup, Mali made football headlines for coming back from losing 4–0 with eleven minutes left to level 4–4 with Angola. It is considered to be one of the best comebacks in recent memory, alongside Sweden's famous comeback against Germany in a 2014 World Cup qualifier with a same scoreline.

Team kit

Results and fixtures

The following is a list of match results in the last 12 months, as well as any future matches that have been scheduled.

2022

2023

Coaching staff

Coaching history
Caretaker managers are listed in italics.

 Ben Oumar Sy (1960–66)
 György Tóth (1966–70)
 Karl-Heinz Weigang (1970–73)
 Mykola Holovko (1979–82)
 Kidian Diallo (1982–89)
 Molobaly Sissoko (1989–93)
 Mamadou Keïta (1993–97)
 Christian Sarramagna (1998–2000)
 Romano Mattè (2000–01)
 Henryk Kasperczak (2001–02)
 Christian Dalger (2002–03)
 Henri Stambouli (2003–04)
 Alain Moizan (2004)
 Mamadou Keïta (2004–05)
 Pierre Lechantre (2005–06)
 Amadou Pathé Diallo (2006)
 Jean-François Jodar (2006–08)
 Stephen Keshi (2008–10)
 Alain Giresse (2010–12)
 Amadou Pathé Diallo (2012)
 Patrice Carteron (2012–13)
 Amadou Pathé Diallo (2013)
 Henryk Kasperczak (2013–15)
 Alain Giresse (2015–17)
 Mohamed Magassouba (2017–2022)
 Éric Chelle (2022–)

Players

Current squad
 The following players were called up for the 2023 Africa Cup of Nations qualification matches against .
 Match dates: 24 and 28 March 2023
 Opposition: 
 Caps and goals correct as of: 15 January 2023, after the match against

Recent call-ups
The following players have been called up for Mali in the last 12 months.

DCL Player refused to join the team after the call-up.
INJ Player withdrew from the squad due to an injury.
PRE Preliminary squad.
RET Player has retired from international football.
SUS Suspended from the national team.

Records

Players in bold are still active with Mali.

Competition records

Africa Cup of Nations

Mali have never won the Africa Cup of Nations; their best result at the tournament was runners-up in 1972. Mali have qualified for the tournament twelve times in total, finishing as runners-up once, third twice, and fourth three times. Prior to 2008, each time Mali qualified, they reached the knockout stage having only qualified four times before then.

African Nations Championship
Mali has competed in four African Nations Championship tournaments, finishing as runners-up twice.

FIFA World Cup

African Games

Head-to-head record

Team honours
Last updated 14 August 2017

Continental tournaments
 Africa Cup of Nations
Runners-up (1):  1972
 African Nations Championship
 Runners-up (2):  2016, 2020

Other Tournaments and Cups
Amilcar Cabral Cup
Champions (3): 1989, 1997, 2007
Runners-up (4): –

Notes

See also

Football in Mali

References

External links

 Mali FF (archived)
 Mali Football Portal
 Mali at FIFA.com
 Courtney, Barrie. Mali – List of International Matches at RSSSF.com  (Last updated: 19 August 2010) 

 
African national association football teams